Midstocket/Rosemount is one of the thirteen wards used to elect members of the Aberdeen City Council. It elects three Councillors.

Councillors

Election results

Elections in the 2020s

Elections in the 2010s

Elections in the 2000s

References

Wards of Aberdeen